Michael T. Boyd is a costume designer from Texas.  A graduate of Texas A&I University, Boyd specializes in period films, and has provided costumes for a number of films, TV miniseries, and other productions, including:

We Were Soldiers
Mudbound
The 24th
Dolly Parton's Heartstrings (Netflix series)
Dolly Parton's Coat of Many Colors
Dolly Parton's Christmas of Many Colors: Circle of Love
Monte Walsh (Tom Selleck remake)
Surface
Into the West
3: The Dale Earnhardt Story
The Faculty
McHale's Navy
In the Army Now
Chasers
Gettysburg

In 1991, Boyd won an Emmy Award in Outstanding Achievement in Costuming for a Miniseries or Special for Son of the Morning Star. In 2006 he was nominated for his second Emmy and the Designers Guild Award for the epic miniseries Into the West. He has also had small roles in some of these projects.

References

People from Bryan, Texas
American costume designers
Living people
Year of birth missing (living people)
Texas A&M University–Kingsville alumni